Cunin is a surname. Notable people with the surname include:

Adelard Cunin, a.k.a. Bugs Moran (1893–1957), American gangster
Marina Cunin, American social anthropologist
Shlomo Cunin, American rabbi
Tzemach Cunin (1976–2019), American rabbi

See also
Kunin (surname)